Mary Colwell is an environmentalist and freelance producer and author.  She previously worked for the BBC Natural History Unit.

Early life 
Colwell's mother was Roman Catholic from Northern Ireland, and her father was an Anglican from Stoke-on-Trent.  She grew up near Stoke-on-Trent, and was raised as a Catholic.  She initially studied physics, but later earth sciences at the University of Bristol.

Career

Producer

In 2009 Colwell was awarded a Sony Radio Award and a World Gold Medal at the New York Festivals Radio Awards for her production "The Budgerigar and the Prisoner", telling the story of a prisoner Les whose life was transformed by caring for a budgerigar.

Writer

In 2014, Colwell published a book on Scottish-American naturalist John Muir, called John Muir: The Scotsman Who Saved America’s Wild Places.  In an interview for A Rocha's Root & Branch magazine, Colwell called Muir her "absolute conservation hero".

In 2016, Colwell did a  walk from Lough Erne, near Enniskillen to Boston, Lincolnshire, to raise awareness of the endangerment of the Eurasian Curlew (Numenius arquata) in the British Isles. In 2018, she released a book titled Curlew Moon, as an account of her self-titled "Curlew Walk" and the plight of the bird; it made Irish Independent's best non-fiction list of 2018.

Activism

Colwell is a noted spokesperson for environmentalism in the United Kingdom and has written articles on the subject the main newspapers.  She was listed at number 27 in BBC Wildlife Magazine'''s Top 50 Most Influential Conservationists in the UK, and has received various awards for her work on promoting environmentalism.

Colwell was one of three recipients of the 2019 Marsh Award from the Wildfowl & Wetlands Trust for her activism around the Curlew including engaging political support from Downing Street (who called the Curlew, "the panda of UK conservation"), and promoting April 21 as World Curlew Day.

Colwell has campaigned with politician Caroline Lucas to have Natural History included as a GCSE exam on the national curriculum, and in May 2020, she told The Daily Telegraph'' it would be taught in schools by 2022.  In October 2020, a final proposal was submitted to the Department for Education.

Personal
Colwell is married to BBC producer Julian Hector, and they have two sons (Hector has three daughters from a previous marriage).

Colwell's faith is an important part of her life, and she describes herself as a Christian.

Works

Articles, interviews, and podcasts

Bibliography

References

External links
Mary Colwell - Earth in Vision, OpenLearn (13 July 2016)

Year of birth missing (living people)
Alumni of the University of Bristol
British environmentalists
BBC radio producers
BBC television producers
English conservationists
English naturalists
English environmentalists
British women environmentalists
British women non-fiction writers
21st-century English women writers
Living people
Women radio producers